Wild Horse Pass Motorsports Park is a 450-acre (180 ha) motorsport racing complex, located in Chandler, Arizona, United States, about  southeast of downtown Phoenix.

History
The facility opened as Firebird International Raceway in 1983. 

In 1985, Firebird hosted the NHRA Fallnationals, the first National NHRA event held at the complex. Gene Snow would win the Top Fuel championship while Bob Glidden clinched the 1985 NHRA world championship.

On May 17, 1987, it held its only IMSA GT race, the Arizona 300.

In December 1992, Three-time Formula One Champion Ayrton Senna tested an IndyCar on the East Course with Team Penske. Senna was intrigued, but eventually decided to stay in Formula One. 

In March 2013, it was announced that the land owner, the Gila River Indian Community and the operator of Firebird International Raceway, Charlie Allen could not reach an agreement on a lease extension and that the complex would close in April. The complex would stay closed throughout March until the Gila River Indian Community announced that they signed a lease agreement with a new operator in June, the complex would change names from Firebird International Raceway to Wild Horse Pass Motorsports Park, named after the neighboring tribal casino and resort Wild Horse Pass while also receiving an investment of more than $1 million in renovations, including repaving the drag-strip.

On Feb 22, 2014, Wild Horse Pass Motorsports Park would reopen and host its first event since closing, the NHRA Arizona National.

In March 2022, it was announced that Wild Horse Pass Motorsports Park would close in February 2023, after NHRA Arizona Nationals, due to the widening of Interstate 10. Radford Racing School and the Radford Racing course will remain open after Wild Horse Pass Motorsports Park closes.

Circuits

References

External links

 World Sports Racing Prototypes - 1987 IMSA GT Championship results

NHRA Division 7 drag racing venues
Motorsport venues in Arizona
Buildings and structures in Chandler, Arizona
Transportation in Chandler, Arizona
IMSA GT Championship circuits
Sports venues in Maricopa County, Arizona
Off-road racing venues in the United States
1983 establishments in Arizona
Sports venues completed in 1983